Henry Robert Feinberg (born July 24, 1941 in Brooklyn, NY) is an interpreter of science and technology. Best known as the person who made it possible for E.T. to “phone home,” he created E.T.'s Communicator for Steven Spielberg's classic film.  Feinberg designed educational exhibits and science demonstrations for Walt Disney's Epcot Center, Universal Studios theme parks in Florida and Los Angeles, and AT&T's InfoQuest Center in New York City.  A noted speaker, education and museum consultant, his work can be seen in science museums around the world. He retired from AT&T in 1998 as National Exhibitions Manager.

As a writer-director, Feinberg received eighteen international film awards for his documentaries, including two coveted CINE Golden Eagle awards. Earlier in his career he worked closely with Don Herbert, TV's "Mr. Wizard," devising innovative ways to demonstrate "the magic and mystery of science in everyday living." At AT&T’s Bell Laboratories, he produced several films and live presentations to explain leading-edge technology to audiences of all ages.

An inventor, writer, photographer and avid amateur radio operator (call letters K2SSQ), Feinberg lives in West Orange, NJ with his wife Debbie, their daughter Shari, and son Michael.

References

External links
 
 http://www.qrz.com/db/?callsign=k2ssq

1941 births
Living people
American film directors
American male screenwriters
Exhibition designers
American inventors
American public relations people
Amateur radio people